Shanahoe is a small village in County Laois, Ireland, situated in the centre of the county, 8 km west of Abbeyleix and 7 km south of Mountrath.

History and development
Evidence of ancient settlement in the area includes a Bronze Age urn which was discovered nearby in the 1930s. The remains of a ringfort are also recorded in Shanahoe townland.

Built mainly along the two main approach roads, the village developed as a predominantly linear settlement. Buildings at the village centre include the village church, community hall and national (primary) school. The M7/M8 Motorway Scheme lies to the west of the village.

Education
Scoil Fionntáin Naofa, the local national (primary) school, was built in 1948. As of 2010, there were 74 pupils enrolled in the school.

Sport
The local Gaelic Athletic Association club is Shanahoe GAA, whose pitches are located about 2 km outside the village.

People
John Keegan (1816–1849), writer, poet and storyteller, was born in Killeaney near the village of Shanahoe.

See also
 List of towns and villages in Ireland

References

Towns and villages in County Laois
Articles on towns and villages in Ireland possibly missing Irish place names